In mathematics, a highly abundant number is a natural number with the property that the sum of its divisors (including itself) is greater than the sum of the divisors of any smaller natural number.

Alaoglu and Erdős tabulated all highly abundant numbers up to 104, and showed that the number of highly abundant numbers less than any N is at least proportional to log2 N.

Formal definition and examples 

Formally, a natural number n is called highly abundant if and only if for all natural numbers m < n,

where σ denotes the sum-of-divisors function. The first few highly abundant numbers are
1, 2, 3, 4, 6, 8, 10, 12, 16, 18, 20, 24, 30, 36, 42, 48, 60, ... .

For instance, 5 is not highly abundant because σ(5) = 5+1 = 6 is smaller than σ(4) = 4 + 2 + 1 = 7, while 8 is highly abundant because σ(8) = 8 + 4 + 2 + 1 = 15 is larger than all previous values of σ.

The only odd highly abundant numbers are 1 and 3.

Relations with other sets of numbers 

Although the first eight factorials are highly abundant, not all factorials are highly abundant. For example,
σ(9!) = σ(362880) = 1481040,
but there is a smaller number with larger sum of divisors,
σ(360360) = 1572480,
so 9! is not highly abundant.

Alaoglu and Erdős noted that all superabundant numbers are highly abundant, and asked whether there are infinitely many highly abundant numbers that are not superabundant.

Despite the terminology, not all highly abundant numbers are abundant numbers.  In particular, none of the first seven highly abundant numbers (1, 2, 3, 4, 6, 8, and 10) is abundant. Along with 16, the ninth highly abundant number, these are the only highly abundant numbers that are not abundant.

7200 is the largest powerful number that is also highly abundant: all larger highly abundant numbers have a prime factor that divides them only once. Therefore, 7200 is also the largest highly abundant number with an odd sum of divisors.

Notes

References 

Divisor function
Integer sequences